"Hi-Heel Sneakers" (often also spelled "High Heel Sneakers") is a blues song written and recorded by Tommy Tucker in 1963.  Blues writer Mary Katherine Aldin describes it as an uptempo twelve-bar blues, with "a spare, lilting musical framework", and a strong vocal. The song's rhythmic approach has also been compared to that of Jimmy Reed.  Tucker's lyrics recall the time he spent as a Golden Gloves boxer in the 1950s:

Background and recording
The song came out of Tucker's association with producer Herb Abramson, who was a co-founder of Atlantic Records. Abramson operated A-1 Sound Studios in New York, where many popular R&B artists recorded; he leased Tucker's recording to Checker Records, which released it as a single in 1964.

Although writers cite a 1963 recording date, there is conflicting information about the studio location. Aldrin puts it in Chicago, while the Blues Foundation locates it in New York City. The song's distinctive guitar parts are provided by Dean Young.  Writing in Encyclopedia of the Blues, Gene Tomko notes the similarity to the introduction and shuffle beat of the popular Jimmy Reed song "Big Boss Man".

Release and chart performance
Abramson leased Tucker's song to Checker Records and in 1964 it was released as a single, backed with "Don't Want 'Cha (Watcha Gonna Do)". It entered Billboard Hot 100 on February 8, 1964, where the single reached number eleven during an 11-week stay (its R&B chart was suspended at the time). In the UK, it reached number 23.

Answer song
In 1964, Sugar Pie DeSanto recorded an answer song titled  "Slip-In Mules (No High Heel Sneakers)". It was written by Tucker and Billy Davis: "they both heard Sugar Pie DeSanrtos's voice in their heads as they put the finishing touches on the tune. It was written in one day, recorded the next, and on the charts a few weeks after it was released". The lyrics play on "Hi-Heel Sneakers", which DeSantos sang in the style of the original:

The single, released by Checker, reached number 48 on Billboards Hot 100 (its R&B chart was suspended at the time).

Legacy
In 2017, the song was inducted into the Blues Foundation Blues Hall of Fame as a "classic of blues recording". In its induction statement, the Blues Foundation noted that "Hi-Heel Sneakers" was the "last blues record from the mighty Chess Records [Checker subsidiary] catalogue to hit No. 1 on the charts" and its popularity as a performance number.

Numerous musicians have recorded "Hi-Heel Sneakers" – Aldin notes the song "has the distinction of having been recorded by such unlikely musical bedfellows as Johnny Rivers, Elvis Presley, Ramsey Lewis, Jose Feliciano, Chuck Berry, the Chambers Brothers, Jerry Lee Lewis, David Cassidy and Boots Randolph, to name but a few."  Tomko explains its influence:

References

1963 songs
1964 singles
Checker Records singles
Blues songs
José Feliciano songs
Elvis Presley songs
Music published by MPL Music Publishing